is a Japanese actor, singer and model best known for his role as Hideki Go (Ultraman The Return of Ultraman. His real name is Hideo Murata (村田 秀雄). He was born in Kyoto and graduated from Heian High School.

Selected filmography

Films
 1983 - Daijōbu, My Friend
 1995 - Zero Woman
 1997 - Ultraman Zearth 2
 2006 - Ultraman Mebius & Ultraman Brothers – Hideki Go / Ultraman Jack
 2008 – Superior Ultraman 8 Brothers – Hideki Go / Ultraman Jack
 2009 – Mega Monster Battle: Ultra Galaxy – Hideki Go / Ultraman Jack
 2010 – Ultraman Zero: The Revenge of Belial – Hideki Go / Ultraman Jack
 2012 – Ultraman Saga – Hideki Go / Ultraman Jack
 2016 – What a Wonderful Family! II

Television
 1971, 1972 – The Return of Ultraman – Hideki Go / Ultraman Jack
 1972 – Ultraman Ace – Hideki Go / Ultraman Jack
 1972 – Wild 7
 1973, 1974 – Ultraman Taro – Hideki Go / Ultraman Jack
 1974, 1975 – Super Robot Mach Baron
 1974 – Ultraman Leo – Hideki Go / Ultraman Jack
 1975, 1976 – Shounen Tanteidan BD7
 1981, 1982 – Robot 8-chan
 1982, 1983 – Batten Robomaru
 1984 – Nebula Mask Machine Man
 1990 – La Belle Fille Masquée Poitrine
 1996, 1997 – Godzilla Island – G-Guard Commander
 2002 – Ninpuu Sentai Hurricaneger – Ikki Kasumi
 2006, 2007 – Ultraman Mebius – Hideki Go / Ultraman Jack
 2012 – MONSTERS
 2012 – Perfect Blue
 2015 – Hamon
 2016 – Doctor X
 2019 – Kishiryu Sentai Ryusoulger

References

1949 births
Japanese male film actors
Japanese male stage actors
Japanese male television actors
Japanese male singers
Living people
Male actors from Kyoto
Japanese people of English descent